The Robert Award for Best Long Featurette was an award presented by the Danish Film Academy at the annual Robert Awards ceremony in 2002, 2003, and 2004.

Honorees 
 2002:  – Klaus Kjeldsen
 2003:  – Pia Bovin
 2004:  – Morten Giese

References

External links 
  

2002 establishments in Denmark
Awards established in 2002
Featurettes
Featurette, long
2005 disestablishments in Denmark
Awards disestablished in 2005